Laura White may refer to:

Laura Lyon White (1839-1916), American suffragist and environmentalist
Laura Rosamond White (1844-1922), American author and editor
Laura Rogers White (1852–1929), American suffragist and architect
Laura Weber White (born 1971), American musician
Laura White (singer) (born 1987), English songwriter
Laura White (actress) (born 1996), English actress

See also
Lori White, American academic, president of DePauw University in 2020